Geoffrey Harris (born January 30, 1987 in Halifax, Nova Scotia) is a Canadian middle-distance runner.  Harris qualified for the 2012 London Olympics in the 800 metres event with two Olympic standards and a first-place finish at the 2012 Canadian Olympics field & Track in Calgary.  At the Olympics, he reached the semi-finals.

Career highlights
 2nd, 2012 Olympic Games Preliminary Heats in a personal best 1:45.97
 1st, 2012 National Championships, Calgary, Canada (Olympic Standard).
 10th, 2006 IAAF World Junior Championships, Beijing, China.
 Best time 600m: 1:18.36,  Montréal, 27/01/2007
 Best time 800m: 1:45.97,  2012 Olympic Games, London, 06/08/2012

References

External links
 IAAF profile

1987 births
Athletes (track and field) at the 2012 Summer Olympics
Canadian male middle-distance runners
Living people
Olympic track and field athletes of Canada
Sportspeople from Halifax, Nova Scotia
Canadian Track and Field Championships winners
21st-century Canadian people